A finance minister is an executive or cabinet position in charge of one or more of government finances, economic policy and financial regulation. The title may also refer to a junior minister in the finance department. The British Treasury, for example, has four junior ministers.

A finance minister's portfolio has a large variety of names across the world, such as "treasury", "finance", "financial affairs", "economy" and "economic affairs". The position of the finance minister might be named for this portfolio, but it may also have some other name, like "Treasurer" or, in the United Kingdom, "Chancellor of the Exchequer". The finance minister is usually in charge of monetary policy, economic policy, fiscal policy, and financial regulation. Many women have been appointed to the post since the mid 1920s. This is a list of women who entitled the position of finance minister; thus an economy minister who is in charge of financial policy will also be included. However economy ministers who head a separate ministry from the finance ministry will not appear in the list.

Sovereign states

Italics denote an acting finance minister or a minister of an extinct state.
Note: Many of the figures given for "term length" appear to be overly precise given that many of the start and end dates are only approximate.

Constituent states, dependent territories, and autonomous regions

Italics denotes an acting finance minister and defunct states/territories/regions

See also
 Financial policy
 Economic policy
Commercial policy
 Fiscal policy
 Financial regulation
 Finance minister
 List of current finance ministers
 Ministry of Finance

External links
Female Finance Ministers
Rulers.org List of rulers throughout time and places

 Female
 Female
Finance

Finance ministers
Finance ministers